The Bangladesh cricket team toured the West Indies in June and July 2022 to play two Test, three One Day International (ODI), and three Twenty20 International (T20I) matches. The Test matches formed part of the 2021–2023 ICC World Test Championship. A draft tour itinerary was announced in May 2022. The full details of the tour were confirmed on 1 June 2022.

On 22 May 2022, the Bangladesh Cricket Board (BCB) announced all the squads for the tour to the West Indies, with Mominul Haque captaining the Test side. However, after Bangladesh lost their two-match Test series against Sri Lanka, Haque resigned as the captain of Bangladesh's Test team. Shakib Al Hasan was named as Bangladesh's new Test captain, with Litton Das being appointed as his deputy.

A day before the first Test, the Test series was named as the Padma Bridge Friendship Series, to celebrate the inauguration of Bangladesh's ambitious Padma Bridge project. The West Indies won the first Test by seven wickets early on the fourth day, after Bangladesh were bowled out for just 103 runs in their first innings. The West Indies won the second Test by ten wickets to win the series 2–0. The defeat in the second Test was Bangladesh's 100th loss in Test cricket.

Between the Test and T20I series, Bangladeshi cricketers reported to have experienced an uncomfortable ferry ride, with several players suffering from motion sickness from high waves due to a cyclone two days previous. One of the players said to Prothom Alo "We are the ones who can fall sick and die here, us, nothing will happen to them. I have toured many countries, this is the first time I am experiencing something like this. None of us are used to this. Forget about playing, what will happen if one of us gets seriously ill in the ferry. This is the worst tour of my life".

The first T20I was delayed by nearly two hours due to a wet outfield. After several rain interruptions, only 13 overs of play was possible, with the match ending in a no result. The following day, the second T20I was played at the same venue, with the West Indies winning by 35 runs. The West Indies won the third and final T20I match by five wickets to win the series 2–0.

Bangladesh won the first ODI match by six wickets to record their first win of the tour. Bangladesh won the second match by nine wickets to win the series with a match to play. Bangladesh won the third ODI match by four wickets to win the series 3–0. Shortly after winning the series, Bangladesh's ODI captain Tamim Iqbal announced his retirement from T20I cricket.

Squads

The West Indies also named Tagenarine Chanderpaul and Shermon Lewis as reserve players for the Test matches. The day before the first Test, Kemar Roach was added to West Indies' Test squad. Romario Shepherd and Dominic Drakes were named as reserve players in the West Indies ODI and T20I squads respectively. Ahead of the first ODI, Keemo Paul tested positive for COVID-19 and was replaced by Romario Shepherd in the West Indies' squad.

Yasir Ali was ruled out Bangladesh's squad for the Test series after suffering a back injury in the warm-up match, with Anamul Haque named as his replacement. Yasir Ali was also later ruled out of the T20I and ODI matches, after failing to recover from his back injury. Ahead of the second Test match, Mohammad Saifuddin was also ruled out of Bangladesh's squad for the T20I and ODI matches due to a back injury. Ahead of the third T20I match, the Bangladesh Cricket Board (BCB) confirmed that Shakib Al Hasan would unavailable for the ODI series.

Warm-up match
Prior to the Test series, Bangladesh played a three-day warm-up match against the CWI President's XI side.

Test series

1st Test

2nd Test

T20I series

1st T20I

2nd T20I

3rd T20I

ODI series

1st ODI

2nd ODI

3rd ODI

Notes

References

External links
 Series home at ESPN Cricinfo

2022 in Bangladeshi cricket
2022 in West Indian cricket
International cricket competitions in 2022
Bangladeshi cricket tours of the West Indies